The West Bengal Legislative Assembly is the unicameral legislature of the Indian state of West Bengal. It is located in the B. B. D. Bagh area of Kolkata, the capital of the state. Members of the Legislative assembly are directly elected by the people. The legislative assembly comprises 294 Members of Legislative Assembly, all directly elected from single-seat constituencies. Its term is five years, unless sooner dissolved.

History

The history of the West Bengal Legislature can be traced back to 18 January 1862 when under the Indian Councils Act of 1861, a 12 Member Legislative Council for Bengal Presidency was established by the Governor-General of British India with the Lt. Governor of Bengal and some nominated members. The strength of the council was gradually enlarged by subsequent acts. Under the Indian Councils Act of 1892, the maximum strength of the council was raised to 20 out of which seven were to be elected. The Indian Councils Act of 1909 further raised the number of members of the council to 50. Under the Government of India Act 1919, the number of members of the Legislative Council was once again raised to 125. The Bengal Legislative Council constituted under the Act of 1919 was formally inaugurated on 1 February 1921 by the Duke of Connaught.

A few years later, under the provisions of the Government of India Act 1935, two chambers of the Bengal Provincial Legislature: the Legislative Council and the Legislative Assembly, were created. The life of the Assembly, consisting of 250 members, was to be five years unless dissolved sooner; while the council, with a membership of not less than 63 and not more than 65, was made a permanent body and not subject to dissolution with the provision that one-third of the members should retire every three years.

On the eve of Independence in 1947, Bengal Province was partitioned into West Bengal and East Bengal (East Pakistan). The West Bengal Legislative Assembly was constituted with 90 members representing the constituencies that fell within the area of West Bengal and two nominated members from Anglo-Indian community. The Bengal Legislative Council stood abolished.  The Legislative Assembly met for the first time after Independence on 21 November 1947.

The Constitution of India again provided for a bicameral Legislature for West Bengal. Accordingly, the West Bengal Legislative Council consisting of 51 members was constituted on 5 June 1952. The number of members in the Legislative Assembly was 240 including two nominated members from the Anglo-Indian Community. After the first General Elections, the new Assembly met for the first time on 18 June 1952.

On 21 March 1969, a resolution was passed by the West Bengal Legislative Assembly for the abolition of the Legislative Council. Subsequently, Indian Parliament passed the West Bengal Legislative Council (Abolition) Act, 1969 abolishing the Legislative Council with effect from 1 August 1969.

List of Assemblies

Members of Legislative Assembly

References

 West Bengal Lok Sabha Election 2019 Results Website

 
State legislatures of India
Unicameral legislatures
1862 establishments in India